"Bounce with Me" is a single released by Canadian singer Kreesha Turner, written and produced by Mike James and Troy Samson of Hipjoint Productions and released on December 4, 2007.

Music video

The music video opens with Kreesha getting ready to go to the club. When she and her friends arrive at the club they are the only ones dancing. By the end of the first chorus everybody in the club is dancing to music. Kreesha then notices a guy from across the room and they keep eyeing each other and finally start dancing. By the end of the music video there are soap suds falling from the ceiling and onto the dance floor. Throughout the video there are scenes of Kreesha singing to the camera in front of a pink and white background.

Charts

Track listing

iTunes Single
1. "Bounce With Me" - 3:08

References

2007 singles
Kreesha Turner songs
2007 songs
EMI Records singles
Songs written by Troy Samson